Donji Dubac is a village in the municipality of Lučani, Serbia. According to the 2002 census, the village has a population of 526 people.

References

Populated places in Moravica District